Boé is a commune in the Lot-et-Garonne department in southwestern France.  It stands on the voie verte cycle path along the Canal de Garonne.

Geography
The Séoune forms part of the commune's eastern border, then flows into the Garonne, which forms the commune's southeastern and southwestern borders.

Population

See also
Communes of the Lot-et-Garonne department

References

Communes of Lot-et-Garonne